This page lists the World Best Year Performances in the year 1980 in the Men's Hammer Throw. One of the main events during this season were the 1980 Summer Olympics in Moscow, Soviet Union, where the final of the men's competition was held on July 31, 1980. The women did not compete in the hammer throw until the early 1990s. The world record was broken five times during the 1980 season.

Records

1980 World Year Ranking

References
digilander.libero
apulanta
hammerthrow.wz

1980
Hammer Throw Year Ranking, 1980